is a Japanese manga series written and illustrated by Yoko Komori. It was serialized in Shueisha's josei manga magazine You, with its chapters collected in two tankōbon volumes.

Publication
Written and illustrated by Yoko Komori, Mermaid Scales and the Town of Sand was serialized in Shueisha's josei manga magazine You from March 15, 2013, to January 15, 2014. Shueisha collected its chapters in two tankōbon volumes, released on August 23, 2013, and February 25, 2014.

In North America, the manga was licensed for English release by Viz Media. They released the series in a single volume on February 21, 2023.

References

Further reading

External links
 

Fantasy anime and manga
Josei manga
Shueisha manga
Viz Media manga